Hypostomus paulinus is a species of catfish in the family Loricariidae. It is native to South America, where it occurs in the Tietê River basin. The species reaches 13.5 cm (5.3 inches) SL and is believed to be a facultative air-breather.

References 

paulinus
Fish described in 1905